Stanley Boardman (born 7 December 1937) is an English comedian.

Early life and career
Boardman was evacuated with his family to Wrexham during the Second World War, and after the family returned to their Merseyside home mistakenly thinking the area had escaped the German bombs, his elder brother Tommy was killed in a bombing raid.

He had been a keen footballer in his youth and was an apprentice at Liverpool F.C. He signed for Tranmere Rovers as a teenager.

Boardman ran a haulage firm before winning a holiday camp talent contest and breaking into television on Opportunity Knocks and The Comedians.

Boardman became known for his anti-German jokes, with his claim that "the Germans bombed our chippy" during the Second World War.

His later involvement in football includes being invited by Ron Atkinson to entertain his Sheffield Wednesday and Aston Villa players before the League Cup finals in 1991 and 1994.

Controversies
An incident during a live edition of Des O'Connor Tonight on Thames in the mid-1980s gained publicity. A joke – about the Second World War reminiscences of a Polish pilot who flew in the Royal Air Force – made play on the word "focke", referring to the German Focke-Wulf aeroplanes.

Boardman's comedic style has led to controversy several times; after telling racist jokes at a Leeds United Player of the Year Award dinner in 2002 (months after two Leeds players had been arrested for assaulting an Asian student), the club withheld his fee, describing his act as "inappropriate and unacceptable", barring him from performing at the club in future. This led to a planned appearance at a Leicester City event being cancelled.

Other appearances
In June 2006 he had a hit with "Stan's World Cup Song", which reached No 15 in the UK Singles Chart.

Fellow comedian Peter Kay wrote about him in his second autobiography "Saturday Night Peter"; in it he describes his early days on the comedy circuit and being on the bill with Stan who at the time had the nickname Stan "The German Fokker" Boardman.

In June 2009, Boardman appeared on Celebrity Wife Swap, and in October 2011 he appeared with his daughter, Andrea Boardman, on the celebrity version of Coach Trip.

References
Notes

Bibliography

External links

1937 births
Comedians from Liverpool
English male comedians
English stand-up comedians
Living people
People from Huyton
Controversies in the United Kingdom
Entertainers from Merseyside